Akshaywat Rai Nagar Station, station code (AYRN), is a railway station in the Sonpur railway division of East Central Railway. Akshaywat Rai Nagar Station is located in Hajipur block of Vaishali district in the Indian state of Bihar.

Railway stations in Vaishali district